Metagonia is a genus of cellar spiders that was first described by Eugène Louis Simon in 1893.

Species
 it contains 91 species, found in the Caribbean, Central America, South America, the United States, and Mexico:
M. amica Gertsch, 1971 – Mexico
M. argentinensis Mello-Leitão, 1945 – Brazil, Argentina
M. asintal Huber, 1998 – Guatemala
M. atoyacae Gertsch, 1971 – Mexico
M. auberti Caporiacco, 1954 – French Guiana
M. belize Gertsch, 1986 – Guatemala, Belize
M. bella Gertsch, 1986 – Mexico
M. bellavista Gertsch & Peck, 1992 – Ecuador (Galapagos Is.)
M. beni Huber, 2000 – Peru, Bolivia, Brazil
M. berlanga Huber, 2022 – Ecuador (Galapagos Is.)
M. bicornis (Keyserling, 1891) – Brazil
M. bifida Simon, 1893 (type) – Brazil
M. blanda Gertsch, 1973 – Guatemala, Honduras
M. bonaldoa Huber, 2000 – Brazil
M. candela Gertsch, 1971 – Mexico
M. capilla Gertsch, 1971 – Mexico
M. cara Gertsch, 1986 – Belize
M. caudata O. Pickard-Cambridge, 1895 – USA to Belize
M. chiquita Gertsch, 1977 – Mexico
M. coahuila Gertsch, 1971 – Mexico
M. conica (Simon, 1893) – Venezuela
M. cuate Gertsch, 1986 – Mexico
M. debrasi Pérez & Huber, 1999 – Cuba
M. delicata (O. Pickard-Cambridge, 1895) – Mexico to Panama
M. diamantina Machado, Ferreira & Brescovit, 2011 – Brazil
M. duodecimpunctata Schmidt, 1971 – Ecuador
M. faceta Gertsch, 1986 – Mexico
M. flavipes Schmidt, 1971 – Ecuador
M. furcata Huber, 2000 – Brazil
M. globulosa Huber, 2000 – Peru, Bolivia
M. goodnighti Gertsch, 1977 – Mexico
M. guaga Gertsch, 1986 – Mexico
M. guianesa Huber, 2020 – Venezuela
M. guttata Huber, 2020 – Venezuela
M. heraldica Mello-Leitão, 1922 – Brazil
M. hitoy Huber, 1997 – Costa Rica
M. hondura Huber, 1997 – Costa Rica
M. iviei Gertsch, 1977 – Mexico
M. jamaica Gertsch, 1986 – Jamaica
M. jarmila Gertsch, 1973 – Belize
M. joya Gertsch, 1986 – Mexico
M. juliae González-Sponga, 2010 – Venezuela
M. lagrimas Huber, 2022 – Ecuador (Galapagos Is.)
M. lancetilla Huber, 1998 – Honduras
M. latigo Huber, 2020 – Venezuela
M. lepida Gertsch, 1986 – Mexico
M. lingua (Schmidt, 1956) – Colombia
M. luisa Gertsch, 1986 – Mexico
M. maldonado Huber, 2000 – Peru, Bolivia
M. mariguitarensis (González-Sponga, 1998) – Venezuela, Brazil, Peru
M. martha Gertsch, 1973 – Mexico
M. maximiliani Brignoli, 1972 – Mexico
M. maya Chamberlin & Ivie, 1938 – Mexico
M. mcnatti Gertsch, 1971 – Mexico
M. modesta Gertsch, 1986 – Mexico
M. modica Gertsch, 1986 – Guatemala
M. nadleri Huber, 2000 – Brazil
M. osa Gertsch, 1986 – Costa Rica
M. oxtalja Gertsch, 1986 – Mexico
M. pachona Gertsch, 1971 – Mexico
M. panama Gertsch, 1986 – Panama
M. paranapiacaba Huber, Rheims & Brescovit, 2005 – Brazil
M. petropolis Huber, Rheims & Brescovit, 2005 – Brazil
M. placida Gertsch, 1971 – Mexico
M. potiguar Ferreira, Souza, Machado & Brescovit, 2011 – Brazil
M. puebla Gertsch, 1986 – Mexico
M. punctata Gertsch, 1971 – Mexico
M. pura Gertsch, 1971 – Mexico
M. quadrifasciata Mello-Leitão, 1926 – Brazil
M. reederi Gertsch & Peck, 1992 – Ecuador (Galapagos Is.)
M. reventazona Huber, 1997 – Costa Rica, Panama
M. rica Gertsch, 1986 – Costa Rica, Panama
M. samiria Huber, 2000 – Peru
M. secreta Gertsch, 1971 – Mexico
M. selva Gertsch, 1986 – Costa Rica
M. serena Gertsch, 1971 – Mexico
M. striata Schmidt, 1971 – Guatemala
M. strinatii (Brignoli, 1972) – Argentina
M. suzanne Gertsch, 1973 – Mexico
M. talamanca Huber, 1997 – Costa Rica
M. taruma Huber, 2000 – Guyana, Brazil
M. tinaja Gertsch, 1971 – Mexico
M. tingo Huber, 2000 – Peru
M. tlamaya Gertsch, 1971 – Mexico
M. torete Gertsch, 1977 – Mexico
M. toro Huber, 1997 – Panama
M. triocular (González-Sponga, 2011) – Venezuela
M. unicolor (Keyserling, 1891) – Brazil
M. uvita Huber, 1997 – Costa Rica
M. yucatana Chamberlin & Ivie, 1938 – Mexico
M. zatoichi Huber, 2022 – Ecuador (Galapagos Is.)

See also
 List of Pholcidae species

References

Araneomorphae genera
Pholcidae
Spiders of North America
Spiders of South America